Sandokan Against the Leopard of Sarawak (Italian: Sandokan contro il leopardo di Sarawak) is a 1964 historical adventure film directed by Luigi Capuano and starring Ray Danton, Franca Bettoia and Guy Madison. It was made as a co-production between Italy and West Germany. It is based on the series of novels by Emilio Salgari featuring the character of Sandokan, a Malayan pirate.

The film's sets were designed by the art director Giancarlo Bartolini Salimbeni and Massimo Tavazzi.

Cast
 Ray Danton as Sandokan 
 Franca Bettoia as Samoa 
 Guy Madison as Yanez 
 Mario Petri as Sir Charles Brooks 
 Alberto Farnese as Tremal Naik 
 Mino Doro as Lumbo 
 Aldo Bufi Landi as Rajani 
 Giulio Marchetti as Sagapar 
 Romano Giomini
 Adriano Vitale
 Giuliana Farnese
 Ferdinando Poggi as Assumbata 
 Franco Fantasia as Kuron 
 Hal Frederick as Kalam

References

Bibliography 
 Goble, Alan. The Complete Index to Literary Sources in Film. Walter de Gruyter, 1999.

External links 
 

1964 films
Italian historical adventure films
1960s historical adventure films
West German films
German historical adventure films
1960s Italian-language films
Films directed by Luigi Capuano
Films set in the 19th century
Films based on the Indo-Malaysian cycle
Films set in East Malaysia
1960s Italian films
1960s German films
Italian-language German films